Valdir Lermen (born 7 April 1977) is a Brazilian cyclist. He competed in the men's time trial at the 1996 Summer Olympics.

References

External links
 

1977 births
Living people
Brazilian male cyclists
Brazilian road racing cyclists
Olympic cyclists of Brazil
Cyclists at the 1996 Summer Olympics
Place of birth missing (living people)